The German Bundesgesetzblatt (BGBl.) (Federal Law Gazette) is a public gazette of the Federal Republic of Germany. It is issued by the Federal Ministry of Justice and Consumer Protection and published by Bundesanzeiger Verlagsgesellschaft mbH.

Since 2023, the Bundesgesetzblatt is published in electronic form, similar to the Official Journal of the European Union and the Bundesanzeiger.

External links
 Official website of the Bundesgesetzblatt (since 2023)
 Archive of the Bundesgesetzblatt (1949 - 2022)

References

Law of Germany
Government gazettes
Publications established in 1949